The 2018 New York Lizards season was the eighteenth season for the New York Lizards of Major League Lacrosse. The Lizards came off a down season in 2017, where they finished 7-7 and missed the playoffs for the first time in four years. In 2018, the Lizards won their last three games of the regular season, clinching the fourth seed in the postseason. However, their playoff run was short-lived as they lost to the Dallas Rattlers in the semifinal round, 15-12.

Joe Spallina enters his eighth season as head coach of the Lizards. Because Tim Soudan did not make the move with the Rattlers to Dallas, Spallina is now the longest-tenured head coach in the league.

Offseason

Transactions
September 27, 2017 - Will Manny resigns with the Lizards on a one-year contract. Manny was acquired in a controversial trade from the Boston Cannons at the trade deadline in 2017.
October 2 - The Lizards lose attackman Matt Gibson to the Atlanta Blaze in the Player Movement period. Gibson was drafted by the Lizards in 2012.
October 12 - The Lizards acquire face-off specialist Brendan Fowler from the Charlotte Hounds in exchange for midfielder Jake Richard and a second round pick in the 2018 collegiate draft.
January 9, 2018 - Defenseman Matt Landis is acquired from the Cannons in exchange for Ryan Walsh and Scott Firman. New York will also give up its first round pick in the supplemental draft to Boston.

Schedule

Regular season

Postseason

Postseason

Standings

References

External links
 Team Website

Major League Lacrosse seasons
New York Lizards